BK Olympic is a Swedish football club located in Lindängen which is a residential area of Malmö.

Background
The club was founded in 1920 as IF Olympia. The following year the club was expanded and it was decided to make an application for provisional membership of the Skånes Fotbollförbund (Skåne Football Association). The club changed its name to BK Olympia and it was decided that the club colours should be green and white.

The club was forced to make a further change in 1924 as there was already a club called Olympia in Stockholm. In order to be granted entry into the Swedish Football Association and Swedish Sports Confederation the club became known as Bollklubben Olympic.

Since their foundation BK Olympic has participated mainly in the middle and lower divisions of the Swedish football league system. Their best performing season so far was in 2022, when they finished sixth in Ettan, the third highest tier of Swedish football. They play their home matches at the Lindängens IP in Malmö. The pitch measures 110 metres by 67 metres.

BK Olympic are affiliated to the Skånes Fotbollförbund.

Season to season

Footnotes

External links
 BK Olympic – Official website
 BK Olympic Facebook

Football clubs in Malmö
Sport in Malmö
Association football clubs established in 1920
1920 establishments in Sweden